William FitzHugh, 4th Baron FitzHugh ( 1399 – 22 October 1452) was an English nobleman and Member of Parliament.

Born at Ravensworth, North Riding of Yorkshire, England. He was the son of Henry FitzHugh, 3rd Baron FitzHugh and Elizabeth Grey. He served as a Member of Parliament from 1429 to 1450.

FitzHugh married, before 18 November 1406, at Ravensworth, Margery Willoughby, daughter of William Willoughby, 5th Baron Willoughby de Eresby, and Lucy le Strange, by whom he had a son and seven daughters:

Henry FitzHugh, 5th Baron FitzHugh, who married Lady Alice Neville, daughter of Richard Neville, 5th Earl of Salisbury and Alice Montacute, 5th Countess of Salisbury, daughter and heiress of Thomas de Montacute, 4th Earl of Salisbury and Lady Eleanor Holland. They were great-grandparents to queen consort Catherine Parr.
Elizabeth FitzHugh, who married Ralph Greystoke, 5th Baron Greystoke.
Eleanor FitzHugh, who married Ranulph Dacre, 1st Baron Dacre of Gilsland.
Maud FitzHugh, who married Sir William Bowes (d. 28 July 1466) of Streatlam, Durham, by whom she was the grandmother of Sir Robert Bowes.
Lora FitzHugh, who married Sir John Constable of Halsham, Yorkshire.
Lucy, who became a nun.
Margery FitzHugh, who married John Melton.
Joan FitzHugh, who married John Scrope, 5th Baron Scrope of Bolton.

Notes

References

1399 births
1452 deaths
People from Ravensworth
English MPs 1429
4
English MPs 1450